Drassonax is an extinct genus of small, weasel-like bear. It lived in North America during the Early Oligocene, around 33 Ma.

References

Bear dogs
Oligocene caniforms
Oligocene mammals of North America
Prehistoric carnivoran genera